Log ASCII standard (LAS) is a standard file format common in the oil-and-gas and water well industries to store well log information. Well logging is used to investigate and characterize the subsurface stratigraphy in a well.

A single LAS file can only contain data for one well, but it can contain any number datasets (called "curves") from that well.  Common curves found in a LAS file may include natural gamma, travel time, or resistivity logs.

External links
 Canadian Well Logging Society: LAS (Log ASCII Standard), accessed 23 December 2014.
 US Geological Survey: Log ASCII Standard (LAS) files for geophysical wireline well logs and their application to geologic cross sections through the central Appalachian basin, accessed 24 January 2009.
 Log I/O Java and .Net library for accessing LAS files and other common well log formats like DLIS, LIS, BIT, SPWLA and CSV 
 Ruby LAS Reader Ruby library for accessing LAS (Log ASCII Standard) files
Computer file formats
Well logging